Kainton is a small town in the Australian state of South Australia situated about 10 km south of Paskeville in the upper Yorke Peninsula.

The Kainton school closed in 1907, but the "Hundred of Clinton School" was renamed "Kainton School" in 1915.

Kainton is located within the federal Division of Grey, the state electoral district of Narungga and the local government area known as the Yorke Peninsula Council.

See also
List of cities and towns in South Australia
Clinton Conservation Park

Notes and references
Notes

Citations

Towns in South Australia
Yorke Peninsula